Jang Ok-chol (born 14 January 1994) is a North Korean footballer.

Career statistics

International

References

External links

1994 births
Living people
People from Hamhung
North Korean footballers
North Korea youth international footballers
North Korea international footballers
Association football forwards